Four's a Crowd is a 1938 American romantic comedy film directed by Michael Curtiz, starring Errol Flynn, Olivia de Havilland, Rosalind Russell and Patric Knowles. The picture was written by Casey Robinson and Sig Herzig from a story by Wallace Sullivan. This was the fourth of nine films in which Errol Flynn and Olivia de Havilland appeared.

Plot
Reporter Jean Christy (Rosalind Russell) works for a newspaper in danger of being thrown away by its young owner, Pat Buckley (Patric Knowles), after Buckley has a falling-out with the editor-in-chief, Robert Lansford (Errol Flynn). Meanwhile, Lansford hopes to gain tycoon John Dillingwell's (Walter Connolly) business for his public relations firm, and uses his position at Buckley's paper to drum up good press for Dillingwell. In the process, he discovers that Dillingwell's granddaughter Lorri (Olivia de Havilland) is Buckley's fiancée. Lansford decides to try to charm Lorri, while Christy makes a play for Buckley.

Cast
 Errol Flynn as Robert Kensington "Bob" Lansford
 Olivia de Havilland as Lorri Dillingwell
 Rosalind Russell as Jean Christy
 Patric Knowles as Patterson "Pat" Buckley
 Walter Connolly as John P. Dillingwell
 Hugh Herbert as Silas Jenkins, Justice of the Peace
 Melville Cooper as Bingham, Dillingwell's butler
 Franklin Pangborn as Preston
 Herman Bing as Herman, a barber
 Margaret Hamilton as Amy, Dillingwell's housekeeper
 Joseph Crehan as Butler Pierce
 Joe Cunningham as Ed Young
 Gloria Blondell as Gertrude, Lansford's 1st secretary
 Carole Landis as Myrtle, Lansford's 2nd Secretary

Production
The film began with the working title of "All Rights Reserved", and was supposedly based on the career of noted public relations man Ivy Ledbetter Lee, who worked for the Rockefeller family. The film's title was changed to Four's a Crowd in February.

Warner Bros. borrowed Rosalind Russell from MGM for the film. William Dieterle was originally slated to direct the film, and Edmund Goulding turned it down, before the studio assigned it to Michael Curtiz. Although principal photography went 12 days over the allotted time, Curtiz still managed to bring it in $12,000 under budget.

At the very end of the film, Flynn and De Havilland, normally the happy couple at the end of any film they're in together, start to kiss passionately, only to hear protests from Russell and Knowles, with whose characters they are now involved. The couples switch places, with De Havilland ruefully saying "Bye, Errol."

Release
With the success of The Adventures of Robin Hood, Errol Flynn was concerned about being typecast as a swashbuckler, and convinced Warner Bros. to cast him in other types of films, specifically screwball comedies. However, Four's a Crowd was not a success at the box office, and encouraged Warner Bros. to keep Flynn in action roles.

References
Notes

External links
 
 
 
 
 Four's a Crowd at Virtual History

1938 films
Warner Bros. films
1930s English-language films
Films directed by Michael Curtiz
1938 romantic comedy films
Films scored by Heinz Roemheld
American romantic comedy films
American black-and-white films
1930s American films